Drillia tumida is a species of sea snail, a marine gastropod mollusk in the family Drilliidae.

Description
The shell grows to a length of 14 mm.

Distribution
This species occurs in the demersal zone of the tropical Eastern Pacific from Mexico to Panama.

References

  Tucker, J.K. 2004 Catalog of recent and fossil turrids (Mollusca: Gastropoda). Zootaxa 682:1–1295
 McLean & Poorman, 1971. New species of Tropical Eastern Pacific Turridae; The Veliger, 14, 89–113

External links
 

tumida
Gastropods described in 1971